2008 Gomelsky Cup was a basketball competition in Europe that occurred in Moscow between September 22, 2008 and September 24, 2008. Four top teams from Euroleague participated in this tournament - CSKA Moscow, Maccabi Tel Aviv, Panathinaikos Athens and Žalgiris Kaunas. Žalgiris Kaunas took the gold, in the end.

Tournament

Semifinal 1

Semifinal 2

Gold-medal match

Bronze-medal match

2008
2008–09 in Russian basketball
2008–09 in Lithuanian basketball
2008–09 in Greek basketball
2008–09 in Israeli basketball